Frank Schulz may refer to:

 Frank Schulz (footballer, born 1961), German footballer
 Frank Schulze (born 1970), German footballer
 Frank F. Schulz (1863–1941), American politician from New York

See also
 Franz Schultz (born 1991), Chilean footballer